Bruce Craven is an American novelist, screenwriter, and educator.

Education
Craven received a B.A. in politics and literature from the University of California at Santa Cruz and an M.F.A. in creative writing from Columbia University.

Education work
Craven directs the Columbia Senior Executive Program at the Columbia Business School. He also teaches the MBA course: Leadership Through Fiction, based on novels, plays and film scripts.

Published works
Craven wrote the novel Fast Sofa in 1993 and later wrote the screenplay for the movie of the same name (2001). The movie starred Jake Busey, Jennifer Tilly, Crispin Glover, and Eric Roberts.

Citations

Sources
Exploring Media Culture: A Guide
Columbia Business School Directory : Detail : Bruce+Craven
The New York Times Movies

Living people
20th-century American novelists
American male screenwriters
University of California, Santa Cruz alumni
Columbia University School of the Arts alumni
American male novelists
20th-century American male writers
Year of birth missing (living people)